The 2029 Asian Winter Games, officially known as the IX Asian Winter Games and commonly known as Trojena 2029, will be the ninth edition of the Asian Winter Games, a pan-Asian winter multi-sport event to be held in Trojena of Neom, Saudi Arabia.

Trojena was elected as the host city at the 41st OCA General Assembly on 4 October 2022 in Phnom Penh, Cambodia.  This will be the first Asian Winter Games held in Saudi Arabia, as well as in Arabian Peninsula. It will also be the first winter sporting event held in an Arabic-speaking country.

References

See also
 2025 Asian Indoor and Martial Arts Games
 2034 Asian Games

 
2029 in Saudi Arabian sport
2029 in multi-sport events
2029 in winter sports
2029
International sports competitions hosted by Saudi Arabia
Multi-sport events in Saudi Arabia
Asian Winter Games